Solanum pseudocapsicum is a nightshade species with mildly poisonous fruit. It is commonly known as the Jerusalem cherry, Madeira winter cherry, or, ambiguously, "winter cherry". These perennials can be grown decoratively as house plants, but in some areas of South Africa, India, Australia and New Zealand it is regarded as a weed.

Overview
The plant is perennial in zones up to USDA 8. Native to Peru and Ecuador, they can survive frosts and cold weather. They generally live up to 10 years, producing fruit usually in their second or third year, and every year after that. They are congeners of tomatoes and the fruit is extremely similar to cherry tomatoes in taste and texture, and are therefore easily confused with them.

The Jerusalem cherry's poison is primarily solanocapsine, which is similar to other alkaloids found in their genus, such as solanine. Although the toxin is poisonous, it is generally not life-threatening to humans. It may cause gastric problems, including vomiting and gastroenteritis as referenced in the obsolete scientific name S. ipecacuanha (roughly "ipecac nightshade").

Jerusalem cherries are possibly poisonous to cats and some birds. Though Jerusalem cherry is distributed by certain birds in the wild – both where native and where introduced, e.g., in Australia by the pied currawong (Strepera graculina) – most popular pet birds, namely parrots and relatives, are not immune to its poison.

Taxonomy
Supposedly, the plant described as Solanum capsicastrum and called false Jerusalem cherry is a closely related but distinct species, and the trade name "winter cherry" is also held to apply to this exclusively. It is said to be recognizable by more mediocre size, and/or a greyish hue to the foliage and/or stems, and/or fruit that have a pronounced yellow hue when unripe and whose pulp is not or less poisonous (though the seeds still are, making the whole fruit still inedible), and/or higher frost hardiness. But these supposed differences are inconsistently given in various horticultural sources, and no botanical source has in recent times distinguished between the two. Indeed, these taxa are now generally held to refer to the same species, and the "false Jerusalem cherry", if it is at all distinguishable, seems to be a chemotype at best, or just a motley collection of cultivars.

The entire list of now-invalid synonyms of S. pseudocapsicum is long, and many homonyms are included within it:

 Solanum capsicastrum Link ex Schau
 Solanum capsicastrum var. caaguazuense Chodat
 Solanum compactum Hort.
 Solanum diffusum Link ex Roem. & Schult. (non Ruiz & Pav.: preoccupied)
S. diffusum Roxb. ex Wall. is S. virginianum L..S. diffusum ssp. miozygum Bitter and S. diffusum var. miozygum (Bitter) J.F.Macbr. are S. ternatum.
 Solanum diflorum Vell.
 Solanum diflorum var. angustifolium Kuntze
Not to be confused with S. angustifolium Mill..
 Solanum diflorum var. hygrophilum (Schltdl.) Kuntze
 Solanum diflorum var. pulverulentum Chodat
 Solanum diphyllum Forssk. (non L.: preoccupied)
 Solanum diphyllum var. pulverulentum Chodat
S. diphyllum Sessé & Moc. is S. nudum. S. diphyllum Sw. ex Dunal in DC. is an undeterminable Lycianthes species. S. diphyllum Osbeck is a nomen nudum.
 Solanum dunnianum H.Lév.
 Solanum eremanthum Dunal
 Solanum hendersonii Hort. ex W.Wight
 Solanum hermannioides Schinz
 Solanum hyemale Salisb.
 Solanum hygrophilum Schltdl.
 Solanum ipecacuanha Chodat
 Solanum ipecacuanha var. calvescens Chodat
 Solanum ipecacuanha var. obovata Chodat
 Solanum jaliscanum Greenm.
 Solanum karstenii Dunal
S. karstenii A.Braun & Bouché is S. felinum.
 Solanum linkianum Roem. & Schult.
 Solanum lucidum M.Martens & Galeotti (non Moric.: preoccupied)
S. lucidum Moric. is Aureliana fasciculata (Vell.) Sendtn..
 Solanum mexiae Standl.
 Solanum microcarpum Vahl
S. microcarpum Cerv. ex Lag. is S. pubigerum Dunal. S. microcarpum Pav. ex Dunal in DC. is S. corymbosum Jacq..
 Solanum montevidense Spreng.
 Solanum plurifurcipilum Bitter
 Solanum singuliflorum Steud.
 Solanum tucumanense Griseb.
 Solanum ulmoides Dunal
 Solanum uniflorum Vell. (non Dunal in Poir.: preoccupied)
S. uniflorum Meyen ex Nees is S. elaeagnifolium Cav.. S. uniflorum Dunal in Poir. and S. uniflorum Sessé & Moc. are Lycianthes mociniana (Dunal) Bitter. S. uniflorum Lag. is an undeterminable Lycianthes species.
 Solanum validum Rusby

As can be seen by the "false Jerusalem cherry" case, several presumed forms, subspecies and varieties have been described of S. pseudocapsicum. But these are generally also not considered to be taxonomically distinct today:
 Solanum pseudocapsicum var. ambiguum Hassl.
 Solanum pseudocapsicum f. calvescens (Chodat) Hassl.
 Solanum pseudocapsicum var. diflorum (Vell.) Bitter
 Solanum pseudocapsicum ssp. diflorum (Vell.) Hassl.
 Solanum pseudocapsicum var. hygrophilum (Schltdl.) Hassl.
 Solanum pseudocapsicum var. lancifolium Moench
 Solanum pseudocapsicum f. microcarpum (Vahl) Hassl.
 Solanum pseudocapsicum var. microcarpum Pers.
 Solanum pseudocapsicum var. normale Kuntze
 Solanum pseudocapsicum f. pilosulum Hassl.
 Solanum pseudocapsicum f.? pilosum Kuntze
 Solanum pseudocapsicum f. pilulosum Hassl.
 Solanum pseudocapsicum var. parvifolium Kuntze
Not to be confused with S. parvifolium.
 Solanum pseudocapsicum var. sendtnerianum Hassl.
Not to be confused with S. sendtnerianum.
 Solanum pseudocapsicum "Thurino" RHS (tentative).
 Solanum pseudocapsicum var. typicum Hassl.

See also
Solanum diphyllum
List of Jerusalem cherry diseases

References

External links
Invasiveness Assessment - Madeira winter-cherry (Solanum pseudocapsicum) in VictoriaCare And Properties Solanum Pseudocapsicum (Madeira Winter Cherry)

pseudocapsicum
Medicinal plants
Flora of Ecuador
Flora of Peru
Crops originating from Ecuador
Crops originating from Peru
Plants described in 1753
Taxa named by Carl Linnaeus